Falsen, also de Falsen, is a Danish and Norwegian noble family.

History
The family descends from Falle Pedersen (1625–1702), who lived on the farm Østrup on Sealand, Denmark. The Falsen family share the same roots as the famous Scanian family Weibull.  

Falle Pedersen's son Enevold Falsen (1686–1769) was Mayor of Copenhagen. He was in 1758 ennobled under the name de Falsen. His son Christian Magnus de Falsen (1719–1799) became a justitiarius in Akershus, Norway. He was the father of the author and the official Enevold de Falsen (1755–1808). Enevold was the father of the statesman Christian Magnus Falsen (‘Father of the Constitution’), County Governor Carl Valentin Falsen, and Rear Admiral Jørgen Conrad de Falsen.

Curiosa
Upon Norway's constitutional independence in 1814, Christian Magnus Falsen presented several proposals for the country's new flag.

See also
 Danish nobility
 Norwegian nobility

References

Literature
 Achen, Sven Tito (1973): Danske adelsvåbener
 Cappelen, Hans (1969): Norske slektsvåpen
 Løvenskiold, Herman Leopoldus (1978): Heraldisk nøkkel
 Munthe, C.M. (1928): Norske slegtsmerker
 Nissen, Harald, and Aase, Monica (1990): Segl i Universitetsbiblioteket i Trondheim
 Steffens, Haagen Krog (1911): Norske Slægter 1912
 Storck, H. (1910): Dansk Vaabenbog
 Thiset, A. Thiset, and Wittrup, P.L. (1904): Nyt dansk Adelslexikon

Danish noble families
Norwegian noble families